The 1998 Bausch & Lomb Championships was a tennis tournament played on outdoor clay courts at the Amelia Island Plantation on Amelia Island, Florida in the United States that was part of Tier II of the 1998 WTA Tour. The tournament was held from April 6 through April 12, 1998.

Finals

Singles

 Mary Pierce defeated  Conchita Martínez 6–7, 6–0, 6–2
 It was Pierce's 2nd title of the year and the 13th of her career.

Doubles

 Sandra Cacic /  Mary Pierce defeated  Barbara Schett /  Patty Schnyder 7–6, 4–6, 7–6
 It was Cacic's only title of the year and the 2nd of her career. It was Pierce's 3rd title of the year and the 14th of her career.

External links
 ITF tournament edition details

Bausch and Lomb Championships
Amelia Island Championships
Tennis tournaments in the United States
Bausch & Lomb Championships
Bausch & Lomb Championships
Bausch & Lomb Championships